"A City in Florida" is an instrumental by Canadian electronic music producer Deadmau5. It was released as the third track from his fifth studio album 4×4=12.

Background
On a Twitch livestream in 2018, Joel Zimmerman revealed that the instrumental originated from a Deadmau5 remix of "Paco Di Bango's World" by Orlando Voorn. Zimmerman intended to officially release the remix, but chose not to, due to sample clearance issues. Zimmerman created a revised version of the remix with all samples from the original removed, and released it as the third track his fifth studio album, 4×4=12. The track title refers to Orlando, Florida, a city sharing the same name as Orlando Voorn.

In popular culture
The instrumental is featured in the 2011 video game Saints Row: The Third, on the fictional radio station K12.

Charts
Following the release of 4x4=12, "A City of Florida" entered the Canadian Hot 100.

References

2010 songs
Deadmau5 songs
Songs written by Deadmau5